Samuel Gumarin is a Filipino politician from the province of Guimaras in the Philippines. He previously serving as a Governor of Guimaras from 2013 to 2022. He was first elected as Governor of the province in 2013 and was re-elected in 2016 and 2019 running as a re-electionist under the PDP–Laban party in the May 13, 2019 election.

References

Living people
Liberal Party (Philippines) politicians
People from Guimaras
PDP–Laban politicians
Governors of Guimaras
Mayors of places in Guimaras
Year of birth missing (living people)